Tree Cornered Tweety is a 1956 Warner Bros. Merrie Melodies cartoon directed by Friz Freleng. The short was released on May 19, 1956, and stars Tweety and Sylvester. The title is a play on "three-cornered hat".

The voices were performed by Mel Blanc. It is one of a few Sylvester and Tweety shorts wherein Tweety does not directly influence the outcome.

The cartoon is a parody of Dragnet, with Tweety narrating the short in the style of Joe Friday.

Plot

Tweety narrates his daily activities as he is spotted, then chased by Sylvester. Utilizing a Jack Webb impression, Tweety delivers his signature "I tawt I taw a puddy tat" line (adding the line "I checked" in the middle of it), then describes his adversary in detail: "A bwack puddy tat, wed nose, white chest. Name...'Tilvester."

Tweety describes Sylvester's attempts, as follows:
 The opening scene, where Sylvester simply crosses the street and walks up the stairs to the room Tweety is located in. An unseen woman roars  "Go away! You alley cat! You hooligan! You troublemaker!" and throws plates at him. Sylvester scurries down the stairs and out of the building.
 Subsequently, Sylvester builds a makeshift bridge of wooden planks to get to the building across the way where Tweety is housed. The bridge collapses as the nails come loose at the base, due to the cat's weight and its poor construction.
 Syvlester then uses a swing to get to Tweety's apartment, but smashes into a telephone pole.
 Sylvester's fourth attempt involves the use of a pilot's ejector seat to get at the high story window where Tweety is, but it hurls him straight through overhead wires, splitting the cat into several lengthwise pieces.
 Tweety feeds with the pigeons at the city library. Sylvester stops by and chases his prey into an automat. Tweety takes refuge behind a window (conveniently labeled "Tweety Pie," right next to the lemon pie). Sylvester inserts a nickel into the slot, opens the door, and gets a spring-loaded pie thrown into his face.
 Following a mountain blizzard, Tweety puts spoons on his feet (as snowshoes) to search for food. Sylvester comes after him on skis, and it appears the speedy cat will catch his dinner...until he crashes into a tree.
 Tweety hides in a treetop in a mine field. Sylvester uses a metal detector to try to avoid the mines, but Tweety throws a magnet at the cat, which draws all the mines at him and results in an explosion.
 A chase on a high wooden bridge in Colorado, where Tweety hides beneath the deck, out of the cat's reach. A determined Sylvester saws a hole in the center of the bridge, but does not realize he is standing in the middle of the portion he is sawing off until well after he has begun his plummet to the river below. Unseen by his predator, Tweety steps out of his way. A British-accented man in a fishing boat spots the falling projectile headed straight for him and takes note of the situation, using Tweety's catchphrase: "I tawt I taw a puddy tat!" Sylvester plunges straight through the boat's hull, causing the cat, the man and his boat to sink ("I did! I did! I did..." the man states, bubbling the last line "...taw a puddy tat!" as he sinks below the surface to end the cartoon).

References

External links

 
 Nuance and Suggestion in the Tweety and Sylvester Series - Written by Kevin McCorry

1956 animated films
Merrie Melodies short films
Short films directed by Friz Freleng
1950s parody films
Films scored by Milt Franklyn
1956 short films
Animated films about cats
Animated films about birds
1950s Warner Bros. animated short films
Tweety films
Sylvester the Cat films
Films produced by Edward Selzer
1950s English-language films
American animated short films